Sybra pluriguttata is a species of beetle in the family Cerambycidae. It was described by Breuning in 1942. It is known from Borneo.

References

pluriguttata
Beetles described in 1942